The Felix Award for Indigenous Artist of the Year is an annual Canadian music award, presented as part of the Félix Awards to honour music by First Nations and Inuit musicians in Quebec. The award was presented for the first time in 2019.

Winners and nominees

References

Indigenous
Indigenous Canadian music awards